Kwaza, or Coaiá, may refer to:
Kwaza people, an indigenous people of Brazil
Kwaza language, their language

See also 
 Kwasa (disambiguation)
 Koaia (disambiguation)

Language and nationality disambiguation pages